Viktor Boitschev is a Bulgarian sprint canoer who competed in the early 1970s. He won two bronze medals at the 1971 ICF Canoe Sprint World Championships in Belgrade, earning them in the C-2 500 m and C-2 1000 m events.

References

Bulgarian male canoeists
Living people
Year of birth missing (living people)
ICF Canoe Sprint World Championships medalists in Canadian